Kkachisan Station is a station on Seoul Subway Line 5, as well as the northwestern terminus of the Sinjeong Branch of Line 2. Seoul Metro operates both Line 2 and 5 platforms.

This station is located in Hwagok-dong, Gangseo-gu, Seoul.

References

Metro stations in Gangseo District, Seoul
Seoul Metropolitan Subway stations
Railway stations opened in 1996
1996 establishments in South Korea
20th-century architecture in South Korea